The  was a fleet of the Imperial Japanese Navy established during World War II.

History
The Northeast Area Fleet was a short-lived operational headquarters of the Imperial Japanese Navy, established on August 5, 1943. As United States Navy forces had driven the Japanese out of the Aleutian Islands in late 1943 to early 1944, an organizational structure was required to coordinate Japan’s northern defenses against the possibility that the United States would extend operations from the Aleutians into the Chishima Islands, Karafuto and to northern Japan itself. The new Northeast Area Fleet was a combined operational command containing surviving elements of the IJN 5th Fleet, IJN 12th Air Fleet and ground elements. As it became eventually evident that the United States had no intention of using the northern approaches to Japan as an invasion route, gradually most of its forces were reassigned to other theaters of the war. The Northeast Area Fleet itself was disbanded on December 5, 1944.

Transition

Commanders of the IJN Northern Area Fleet
Commander in chief 

Chief of staff

Notes

References

Fleets of the Imperial Japanese Navy
Military units and formations established in 1943
Military units and formations disestablished in 1944